The Abhira kingdom in the Mahabharata is either of two kingdoms near the Sarasvati river.
They were dominated by the Abhiras, sometimes referred to as Surabhira also, combining both Sura and Abhira kingdoms. Modern day Abhira territory lies within Northern areas of Gujarat and Southern Rajasthan, India.

Reference to Abhiras in literature

According to the Puranas 
All the kshatriya (warrior caste) were killed in a massacre led by Parshuram. Only the Abhiras survived by escaping into the craters between mountains. The sage Markandeya remarked that all Kshatriya have been killed but Abhira have survived they will surely rule the earth in Kaliyuga." Vātsyāyana also mentions the Abhira kingdoms in the Kama Sutra. References of Abhira being residents of kingdom ruled by Yudhisthira is found in Bhagwatam.

Abhiras are mentioned as warriors in support of Duryodhana in Mahabharta war. The Gopas, whom Krishna had offered to Duryodhana to fight in his support when he himself joined Arjuna's side, were no other than the Yadavas themselves, who were also the Abhiras. Their king, Chitra, was killed by Prativindhya, the son of Yudhishthira and Draupadi. The Abhiras also have been described as Vrata Kshatriyas. The Abhir, Gopa, Gopal. and Yadavas are all synonyms. They defeated the hero of Mahabharatha war, sparing him when he disclosed the identity of the members of the family of Sri Krishna.

Abhira kingdom of Maharashtra
The Abhiras established a large kingdom in Maharashtra, succeeding the Satavahanas, which included Nasik, Aparanta, Lata, Khandesh and Vidarbha.

See also 
 Abhira dynasty
 Abhira tribe
 Kingdoms of Ancient India
 Ahir
 Yadav
 Yaduvanshi Ahirs

References 

Kisari Mohan Ganguli, The Mahabharata of Krishna-Dwaipayana Vyasa Translated into English Prose, 1883–1896.

Kingdoms in the Mahabharata
Ancient empires and kingdoms of India
Yadava kingdoms